Carlo Sabajno (1874 in Rosasco, Italy – 1938 in Milan) was an Italian conductor. From 1904 to 1932, he was the Gramophone Company's chief conductor and artistic director in Italy, responsible for some of the earliest full-length opera recordings, most of them with the orchestra of La Scala, Milan and prominent singers there.  Particularly outstanding among these are his stately, authoritative late-1920s and early-1930s electrical recordings of Don Pasquale (with Tito Schipa in his only complete opera recording as Ernesto), Traviata (sadly limited by more than the usual cuts, but with silvery-voiced Alessandro Ziliani as Alfredo), Aida (with Irene Minghini-Cattaneo's Amneris and Aureliano Pertile's Radamès), Otello (with Apollo Granforte as a formidable Iago) and Bohème (a superb understated, but highly distinguished, collaboration with excellent, if lesser-known, singers).

Discography
1907 
1907 Leoncavallo: Pagliacci – Antonio Paoli, Giuseppina Huguet, Ernesto Badini; Orchestra and Chorus of La Scala, Milan
1907 Verdi: Aida - Teresa Chelotti, Orazio Cosentino, Vittoria Colombati, Giovanni Novelli, Alfredo Brondi; Orchestra and Chorus of La Scala, Milan
1915 - 1919
1915 Mascagni: Cavalleria rusticana – Giorgina Ermolli, Franco Tuminello, Eugenio Perna; Orchestra and Chorus of La Scala, Milan
1915 Verdi: La traviata – Margherita Bevignani, Franco Tuminello, Ernesto Badini; Orchestra and Chorus of La Scala, Milan
1916-17 Verdi: Rigoletto – Giuseppe Danise, Ayres Borghi-Zerni, Carlo Broccardi, Ernesto Badini, Olga Simzis; Orchestra and Chorus of La Scala, Milan
1917 Leoncavallo: Pagliacci – Luigi Bolis, Anita Conti, Giuseppe Montanelli; Orchestra and Chorus of La Scala, Milan
1917 Puccini: La bohème – Gemma Bosini, Reno Andreini, Ernesto Badini, Adalgisa Giana; Orchestra and Chorus of La Scala, Milan
1918-19 Puccini: Tosca – Lya Remondini, Carlo Broccardi, Dario Zani; Grande Orchestra and Chorus
1919 Puccini: Tosca – Valentina Bartolomasi, Attilio Salvaneschi, Adolfo Pacini; Orchestra and Chorus of La Scala, Milan
1919 Rossini: Il barbiere di Siviglia – Ernesto Badini, Malvina Pereira, Edoardo Taliani; Orchestra and Chorus of La Scala, Milan
1919 Verdi: Aida – Valentina Bartolomasi, Enrico Trentini, Rosita Pagani, Adolfo Pacini, Guido Fernandez; Orchestra and Chorus of La Scala, Milan
1920 Giordano: Andrea Chénier – Luigi Lupato, Valentina Bartolomasi, Adolfo Pacini; Orchestra and Chorus of La Scala, Milan
1920 - 1930
1920 Bizet: Carmen - Fanny Anitùa, Luigi Bolis, Ines Maria Ferraris, Cesare Formichi; Orchestra and Chorus of La Scala, Milan
1920 Gounoud: Faust – Giuliano Romagnoli, Fernando Autori, Gemma Bosini, Adolfo Pacini, Gilda Timitz; Orchestra and Chorus of La Scala, Milan
1921 Puccini: Madama Butterfly – Ottavia Giordano, Santo Santonocito, Ginevra Amato, Adolfo Pacini; Orchestra and Chorus of La Scala, Milan
1927-1928 Verdi: Rigoletto – Luigi Piazza, Lina Pagliughi, Tino Folgar; Orchestra and Chorus of La Scala, Milan
1928 Puccini: La bohème – Rosina Torri, Aristodemo Giorgini, Ernesto Badini, Thea Vitulli; Orchestra and Chorus of La Scala, Milan;
1928 Verdi: Aida – Dusolina Giannini, Aureliano Pertile, Irene Minghini-Cattaneo, Giovanni Inghilleri, Luigi Manfrini; Orchestra and Chorus of La Scala, Milan
1929 Verdi: Requiem - Maria Luisa Fanelli, Irene Minghini-Cattaneo, Franco Lo Giudice, Ezio Pinza; Orchestra and Chorus of La Scala, Milan
1929 Leoncavallo: Pagliacci – Alessandro Valente, Adelaide Saraceni, Apollo Granforte; Orchestra and Chorus of La Scala, Milan
1929-30 Mascagni: Cavalleria rusticana – Delia Sanzio, Giovanni Breviario, Piero Biasini; Orchestra and Chorus of La Scala, Milan
1929-30 Puccini: Madama Butterfly – Margaret Burke Sheridan, Lionello Cecil, Ida Mannarini, Vittorio Weinberg; Orchestra and Chorus of La Scala, Milan
1929-30 Puccini: Tosca – Carmen Melis, Piero Pauli, Apollo Granforte; Orchestra and Chorus of La Scala, Milan
1930 - 1932
1930 Verdi: Il trovatore: – Aureliano Pertile, Maria Carena, Irene Minghini-Cattaneo, Apollo Granforte; Orchestra and Chorus of La Scala, Milan
1930-31 Verdi: La traviata – Anna Rosza, Alessandro Ziliani, Luigi Borgonovo; Orchestra and Chorus of La Scala, Milan
1931 Bizet: Carmen – Gabriella Besanzoni, Piero Pauli, Maria Carbone, Ernesto Besanzoni; Orchestra and Chorus of La Scala, Milan
1931-32 Verdi: Otello – Nicola Fusati, Maria Carbone, Apollo Granforte; Orchestra and Chorus of La Scala, Milan
1932 Donizetti: Don Pasquale – Ernesto Badini, Tito Schipa, Adelaide Saraceni, Afro Poli; Orchestra and Chorus of La Scala, Milan

Sources
Centre for the History and Analysis of Recorded Music, "The House Conductor: Carlo Sabajno". Accessed 26 February 2009.
Gaisberg, Frederick William, Music on Record, 3rd Edition, Hale, 1948, p. 158.
Garbutt, Tony, "Letters: Gramophone conductors", Gramophone, May 1990, p. 5

External links
 Carlo Sabajno recordings at the Discography of American Historical Recordings.

20th-century Italian conductors (music)
20th-century Italian male musicians
Italian male conductors (music)
People from the Province of Pavia
1874 births
1938 deaths